Pakuahat Degree College is a college in Pakuahat in the Malda district of West Bengal, India. The college is affiliated to the University of Gour Banga, offering undergraduate courses.

Departments
Bengali 
English
History
Political science
Sociology
Geography

See also

References

External links 
Pakuahat Degree College
University of Gour Banga
University Grants Commission
National Assessment and Accreditation Council

Universities and colleges in Malda district
Colleges affiliated to University of Gour Banga
Academic institutions formerly affiliated with the University of North Bengal
Educational institutions established in 1997
1997 establishments in West Bengal